The following radio stations broadcast on FM frequency 101.5 MHz:

Argentina
 LRI405 in Arteaga, Santa Fe
 Radio María in Córdoba
 Radio María in Ituzaingo, Corrientes
 Radio María in Río Grande, Tierra del Fuego
 Radio María in Monte Quemado, Santiago del Estero
 Radio María in Barrancas, Santa Fe
 Radio María in Elortondo, Santa Fe

Australia
 Sky Sports Radio in Grafton, New South Wales
 4OUR in Caboolture, Queensland
 ABC Classic in Townsville, Queensland
 ABC Classic in Latrobe Valley, Victoria
 3BBS in Bendigo, Victoria
 5UV in Adelaide, South Australia
 Triple J in Canberra, Australian Capital Territory
 4RGK in Rockhampton, Queensland

Canada (Channel 268)
 CBCA-FM in Attawapiskat, Ontario
 CBCF-FM in Fort Hope, Ontario
 CBFV-FM in Waswanipi, Quebec
 CBGA-15-FM in L'anse a Valleau, Quebec
 CBKB-FM in Beauval, Saskatchewan
 CBK-FM-2 in Warmley, Saskatchewan
 CBMT-FM in La Tabatiere, Quebec
 CBNG-FM in Glovertown, Newfoundland and Labrador
 CBRX-FM in Rimouski, Quebec
 CBTJ-FM in Hampden, Newfoundland and Labrador
 CBVN-FM in New-Carlisle, Quebec
 CBVS-FM in Mistassini, Quebec
 CBWH-FM in Grand Rapids, Manitoba
 CBWR-FM in Little Grand Rapids, Manitoba
 CBZ-FM in Saint John, New Brunswick
 CHFA-6-FM in Fort McMurray, Alberta
 CHQX-FM in Prince Albert, Saskatchewan
 CHTI-FM in Timmins, Ontario
 CIBL-FM in Montreal, Quebec
 CIGO-FM in Port Hawkesbury, Nova Scotia
 CILK-FM in Kelowna, British Columbia
 CIOI-FM in Hamilton, Ontario
 CJGL-FM in Gladstone, Manitoba
 CJKL-FM in Kirkland Lake, Ontario
 CJUM-FM in Winnipeg, Manitoba
 CKCE-FM in Calgary, Alberta
 CKMO-FM in Orangeville, Ontario
 CKNL-FM in Fort St. John, British Columbia
 CKWF-FM in Peterborough, Ontario
 VF2004 in Granisle, British Columbia
 VF2374 in New Denver, British Columbia
 VF2535 in Terrace, British Columbia
 VF2556 in Crescent Valley, British Columbia

China 
 CNR The Voice of China in Conghua

Greece
 Radio Kriti in Crete

Malaysia
 Raaga in Seremban, Negeri Sembilan
 Lite in Ipoh, Perak

Mexico
XHABO-FM in Los Cabos, Baja California Sur
 XHAS-FM in Nuevo Laredo, Tamaulipas
 XHAVO-FM in Rio Bravo, Tamaulipas
 XHBB-FM in Acapulco, Guerrero
XHCSAP-FM in La Paz, Baja California Sur
 XHDB-FM in Tonalá, Chiapas
 XHEPAR-FM in Villahermosa, Tabasco
 XHJY-FM in Autlán de Navarro, Jalisco
 XHPCOM-FM in Comitán de Domínguez, Chiapas
XHRFM-FM in Moctezuma, Sonora
 XHVLO-FM in Guanajuato, Guanajuato
 XHWK-FM in Guadalajara, Jalisco
 XHYK-FM in Conkal (Mérida), Yucatán

Philippines
DWQW in Naga City
DWWG in Cabanatuan
DWEJ in Lucena City
DYOO in Bacolod City
DXRL in Cagayan de Oro City
DXWK in General Santos City

United States (Channel 268)
 KALV-FM in Phoenix, Arizona
 KAMB in Merced, California
  in Kealakekua, Hawaii
 KATW in Lewiston, Idaho
 KBWV-LP in Bacavi, Arizona
 KCCL in Woodland, California
  in Ortonville, Minnesota
 KCVI in Blackfoot, Idaho
 KCYR-LP in Kerrville, Texas
 KDDV-FM in Wright, Wyoming
 KDLZ in The Dalles, Oregon
 KDNH-LP in Marshalltown, Iowa
  in Oakley, Utah
  in Eureka, California
  in Saint James, Minnesota
 KEPJ-LP in San Antonio, Texas
  in Crosby, Minnesota
 KFGM-FM in Frenchtown, Montana
 KFLY in Corvallis, Oregon
 KFQM-LP in Los Angeles, California
  in San Diego, California
 KGFI-LP in Anaheim, California
  in Bakersfield, California
 KGJX in Fruita, Colorado
 KHSX-LP in Houston, Texas
  in Ruidoso, New Mexico
 KIEF-LP in Three Forks, Montana
 KIEI-LP in San Antonio, Texas
  in Iola, Kansas
  in Baker, California
  in Collinsville, Oklahoma
 KJHM in Watkins, Colorado
  in Eddyville, Iowa
 KLBL in Malvern, Arkansas
 KLBQ in Junction City, Arkansas
 KLJJ-LP in Spring, Texas
  in Manhattan, Kansas
 KNUE in Tyler, Texas
  in Beebe, Arkansas
 KOCC-LP in Oxnard, California
 KOCD in Okeene, Oklahoma
 KOCI-LP in Newport Beach, California
 KOCL-LP in Anaheim, California
 KOER-LP in Cypress, Texas
 KORM-LP in Corona, California
  in Columbia, Missouri
  in Seattle, Washington
 KQBH-LP in Los Angeles, California
 KQSG-LP in El Monte, California
  in Mahnomen, Minnesota
 KRJY-LP in Yuma, Arizona
 KRMQ-FM in Clovis, New Mexico
 KROJ-LP in Panorama City, California
  in Hastings, Nebraska
  in Buda, Texas
 KSMM-FM in Liberal, Kansas
  in Snyder, Texas
  in Bismarck, North Dakota
 KSTG-LP in Lodi, California
 KSZN-LP in Flagstaff, Arizona
 KTAL-LP in Las Cruces, New Mexico
  in Truckee, California
 KTNN-FM in Tohatchi, New Mexico
 KUEH-LP in Yselta del Sur Pueblo, Texas
  in Gregory, South Dakota
 KVLP-LP in Visalia, California
 KVRN-LP in Portland, Oregon
  in Pecos, New Mexico
 KXAQ-LP in Liberty, Texas
 KXVB in Greenland, Arkansas
 KYLP-LP in Greenville, Texas
 KYQT-LP in Portland, Oregon
 KZCL-LP in Cleveland, Texas
 KZKA-LP in Los Angeles, California
 KZNQ-LP in Santa Clarita, California
 KZYQ in Eudora, Arkansas
 WABZ-LP in Albemarle, North Carolina
 WBAC-LP in Belmont, North Carolina
 WBGW-FM in Fort Branch, Indiana
  in Waynesboro, Pennsylvania
 WBLY-LP in Sycamore, Georgia
  in Bloomington, Illinois
  in Fredericksburg, Virginia
 WCFA-LP in Cape May, New Jersey
  in Carbondale, Illinois
 WCLI-FM in Enon, Ohio
  in Centerville, Ohio
 WDKC in Covington, Pennsylvania
 WELX in Isabela, Puerto Rico
 WEXP (FM) in Brandon, Vermont
  in Manchester, Tennessee
 WHCP-LP in Cambridge, Maryland
 WHDZ in Buxton, North Carolina
 WHRU-LP in Huntley, Illinois
  in Madison, Wisconsin
  in Iron Mountain, Michigan
  in Marietta, Georgia
 WKKG in Columbus, Indiana
 WKMO-FM in Vine Grove, Kentucky
 WKXW in Trenton, New Jersey
 WLCB-LP in Burlington, Wisconsin
 WLGS-LP in Lake Villa, Illinois
 WLXX in Richmond, Kentucky
 WLYF in Miami, Florida
 WMFB-LP in Charlotte, North Carolina
  in Gaylord, Michigan
  in Manistee, Michigan
  in Olean, New York
  in Saint Joseph, Tennessee
  in South Bend, Indiana
  in Jackson, Tennessee
  in Pittsburgh, Pennsylvania
  in Poughkeepsie, New York
  in Saint Petersburg, Florida
  in Columbiana, Alabama
 WQML in Ceiba, Puerto Rico
 WQUT in Johnson City, Tennessee
 WRAL (FM) in Raleigh, North Carolina
  in Canton, New York
  in Marlboro, Vermont
  in Toledo, Ohio
 WSOL-FM in Yulee, Florida
  in Pensacola, Florida
 WVES in Chincoteague, Virginia
 WVFB in Celina, Tennessee
  in Vinton, Virginia
  in Providence, Rhode Island
 WWBN in Tuscola, Michigan
 WWGI-LP in Fayette, Mississippi
 WWJC in Augusta, Wisconsin
 WWLK-FM in Meredith, New Hampshire
 WWUN-FM in Friar's Point, Mississippi
  in Gallipolis, Ohio
 WXEP-LP in San Antonio, Texas 
  in Homer, New York
 WXMB-LP in Myrtle Beach, Florida
 WXNA-LP in Nashville, Tennessee
  in Quincy, Florida
  in Baton Rouge, Louisiana
 WZWK-LP in Greenville, South Carolina

Lists of radio stations by frequency